Ferid Muhić (born 1943 in Zavidovići, Bosnia and Herzegovina) is President of the Bosniak Academy of Sciences and Arts. He is a professor of Philosophy at the Ss. Cyril and Methodius University in Skopje, North Macedonia. He started his academic career as Assistant at the Institute for Sociological Research in Skopje in 1970. He entered the Department of Philosophy as Assistant in 1974; Associate Professor 1976-1980; Full-time Professor 1980–present. Visiting Professor at Sorbonne, New York's Syracuse University, Florida State University, International Institute of Islamic Thought and Civilisation, and several universities in Southern-East Europe. Main professional specialties: contemporary philosophy, cultural anthropology, aesthetics and political philosophy.

Books
Methods of Criticism, 1977
Revolutions and Class Struggles, 1978;
Philosophy of Iconoclasm, 1983,
BiH; Motivation and Meditation, 1988;
The Shield of Gold  1988
 nine editions so far, translated in Macedonian, English, French, Albanian and Turkish
 first edition published in Yugoslavia;
Noumenology of the Body, 1994
Soul's Rose, 1994;
The Language of Philosophy, 1995;
Macedonia: Catena Mundi, 1995;
Sense and Virtue, 1996;
Yugoslavia and After
The Great Building and Other Conversations with the Unknown One, 2001
Logos and Hierarchy, 2001

Poetry
Ferid Muhić has also published three books of poetry: 
Falco Peregrinus, 1988;
A Hundred Steps Above, 1994;
The Smoke From The Dream-ends, 1996.

Online essays
Austrian Heads, short story
The Tzar Bird essay

1944 births
Living people
Bosniaks of Bosnia and Herzegovina
Bosnia and Herzegovina Muslims
20th-century philosophers
21st-century philosophers
Florida State University faculty
Syracuse University faculty
Academic staff of the University of Paris
Macedonian mountain climbers
Academic staff of the Ss. Cyril and Methodius University of Skopje
Bosnia and Herzegovina philosophers
Bosnia and Herzegovina writers